Fiji competed at the 2015 Pacific Games in Port Moresby, Papua New Guinea from 4 to 18 July 2015. A total of 481 competitors for Fiji were listed as of 4 July 2015.

Athletics

Basketball

Women
Dissiola Kaseva Boseiwaqa
Vilisi Elesi Tavui
Bitila Sigani Tawake
Mereleni Dreke Tora
Hannah Cawai Camari Tuikoro
Letava Vanui Williams Whippy
Mickaelar Keeka Whippy
Ada Mary Dansey
Seini Macrae Dobui
Tiyanna Kainamoli
Leba Lakoisolomone Korovou
Makilita Koyamainavure
Miliakere Koyamainavure
Valerie Nainima
Amalaini Raluvenitoga

Men
Tui Leifanau Sikivou
William Qounadovu
Joshua Fox
Mataika Koyamainavure
Johnny Eki Seruvatu
Pita Gus Nacagilevu Sowakula
Marques Reid Whippy
Waymann Whippy
Orisi Rawaqa Naivalurua
Esala Ligani Banuve
Kolinio Buiboto Matalau
Leonard Everett Everett Whippy

Beach volleyball

Women
Sukannika Qaqa
Iliseva Ratudina
Sereia Dievo Speed
Alitia Matanakovei Yaya

Men
Aisake Baleimaiamerika
Ratu Wesele Seru Sukanaveita Cawanikawai
Raymond Stoddart

Bodybuilding

Boxing

Fiji qualified 7 athletes in boxing
 Winston Mark Hill
 Viliame Vitu Kalulu
 Akaash Ram
 Pauliasi Ratu
 Josefa Ravudi
 Tina Anthony Ruata
 Mitieli Sefanaia Vakacegu

Cricket

Fiji qualified a women's cricket team (15 players):

 Women
Women's tournament.
 Miliniai Balebua
 Loma Kacilala Batinibuli
 Timaima Bulatalei
 Mere Dainitoga
 Alicia Zureen Dean
 Adi Joana Sigaiwasa Lesianawai
 Semaema Lewanivale Lomani
 Ruci Kaiwai Muriyalo
 Silipa Tikosaya Raratabu
 Luanne Notina Rika
 Luisa Vosaki Tawatatau
 Vilimaina Salusalu Tuapati
 Marica Nira Vua
 Maca Tacola Vuruna
 Ilisapeci Vulisere Waqavakatoga

Field hockey

Football

Fiji qualified men's and women's teams in football (46 athletes):

Women
Group stage – Women's tournament.
Vasiti Babra Patricia Adimaira
Miriama Naiobasali
Stella Naivalulevu
Sonali Rao
Laijipa Daini
Bela Ratubalavu
Hilda Reshmi
Viniana Riwai
Vasiti Kuma Solikoviti
Jotivini Tabua
Torika Delai
Luisa Tamanitoakula
Wasela Tinai
Unaisi Tuberi
Varanisese Namena Tuicakau
Joana Seniuca Tuwai
Melaia Vakawale
Matelita Vuakoso
Naomi Waqanidrola
Mereoni Yabakidrau
Sofi Diyalowai
Vilorina Drotini
Jijilia Dugucanavanua
Vanisha Kumar
Lewamanu Moce
Joyce Naceva
Annette Nainima

Men
4th – Men's tournament.

Head coach:  Juan Carlos Buzzetti

Golf

Karate

Lawn bowls

Men
David Aitcheson
Women
Radhika Prasad
Sarote Hiagi
Litia Tikoisuva
Sheral Mar
Elizabeth Moceiwai

Netball

Outrigger canoeing

Powerlifting

Rugby league nines

Men
4th – lost the 3rd place play-off 14-16 to Tonga.
Waisea Bati
Wame Belolevu
Esira Dokoni
Eliki Ledua
Jiuta Lutumailagi
Jovilisi Naqitawa
Roko Naulivou
Etuate Qionimacawa
Nemani Raiwalui
Tomasi Ravouvou
Etika Rokobuli
Asaeli Saravaki
Jone Sariri
Nereo Senimoli
Lepani Tacikalou
Coach: Maika Vunivere

Rugby sevens

 Women
 – Women's tournament.

 Rusila Nagasau
 Litia Naiqato
 Elina Ratauluva
 Akosita Ravato
 Timaima Ravisa
 Ana Maria Roqica
 Asinate Savu
 Rusila Tamoi
 Timaima Tamoi
 Lavenia Tinai
 Luisa Tisolo
 Talica Vodo

 Men
 – Men's tournament.

 Abele Yalayalatabua
 Jasa Veremalua
 Viliame Mata
 Emosi Mulevoro
 Amenoni Nasilasila
 Vatemo Ravouvou
 Kitione Taliga
 Isake Katonibau
 Manueli Laqai
 Sitiveni Waqa
 Keponi Paul
 Savenaca Rawaca

Sailing

Shooting

Fiji qualified ten athletes in shooting:

Men
 Adarsh Krishneel Datt 
 Sunil Datt 
 Glenn Kable 
 Faiyum Murtaza Khan 
 Nihal Nishant Naicker 
 Swee Seng Phua (Michael) Phua 
 Christian Gerald Pau Stephen 
 Quintyn Sargun Francis Stephen 
 George William Fifita Tudreu 
 Daniel Wah

Squash

Swimming

Women
Adi Kinisimere Vunisea Esiteri Naivalu
Caroline Puamau
Cheyenne Rova
Iris Hefrani Pene
Matelita Buadromo
Rosemarie Rova
Tieri Ann Rachael Erasito
Yolani Julia Blake

Men
Brosnan Paul Erbsleben
Carl Probert
Douglas Miller
Eugene Kado
Gordon Thompson
Kinver Ray Filipo Nicholls
Meli Malani
Oakley Johns
Paul Elaisa
Taichi Vakasama
William James Clark

Table tennis

Women
Shriti Vandana Vandana Jeet
Xuan Li
Grace Rosi Yee

Taekwondo

Tennis

Triathlon

Volleyball

Weightlifting

References

2015 in Fijian sport
Nations at the 2015 Pacific Games
Fiji at the Pacific Games